The Chicago Half Marathon or Chicago Half Marathon & 5K is an annual half marathon and 5k run occurring in September on the South Side of Chicago.  The race takes place on a largely out-and-back course along Lake Shore Drive with views of Lake Michigan and the Chicago skyline.

The race is regarded as a premier half marathon event, with Runner's World naming it as one of the top 10 half marathons in the United States.  Susan Nicholl is the race director and founder of the event. With 20,000 registrants and 13,537 finishers in 2009, the race bills itself as the fifth largest half marathon in the United States and the 21st largest road running event in the country. 

According to the Chicago Sun-Times, this race is known as "The People's Race".

Overview
The course passes by or through several of the most prominent parts of the Chicago Park District on the South Side including Midway Plaissance, Jackson Park and Burnham Park.  The route passes through several community areas: Woodlawn, the South Shore border, Hyde Park, Kenwood, Oakland, and Douglas.  The first running October 5, 1997 occurred along the Lake Michigan lakefront and finished in Grant Park. In 1998, the race moved to the South Side course that begins and ends near the Museum of Science and Industry.  That year's race, which had 4100 runners, was part of the USA Track & Field state championship series, crowning the state half marathon champions.  The race is now listed as one of three half marathons in Chicago.

Some runners, including 2009 winner Patrick Rizzo, use the race to prepare for the Chicago Marathon.  Others, such as four-time winner Chris Wehrman, have used it as a tuneup for the New York City Marathon.  The 2004 edition of the race, which had 9,000 runners, served as the USA Track and Field State Championship.

The first race, which had over 3000 competitors, was won by Grzegorz Olszowik of Willowbrook, Illinois (1:09.46) and 1996 Marathon Olympian Jenny Spangler of Gurnee, Illinois (1:20.19). Greg Costello won the race three consecutive times from 2006-2008.  Chris Wehrman won the race 4 times in 5 years between 2000 and 2004. In 2006, Banco Popular became the title sponsor of what was called the Banco Popular Chicago Half Marathon presented by the Illinois Agents of Farmers Insurance.  It continued as sponsor until 2008 when the race was known as the Banco Popular Chicago Half Marathon  & 5K.

In 2022, the City of Chicago requested that the route be shortened just before the start of the race. A city spokesperson claimed that the change was necessary to “ensure the safety of race participants due to a conflict with vehicles around 31st Street,” which was related to traffic from the Chicago Bears game at Soldier Field. The race organizers did not inform any participants until after the race. The change resulted in a course that was 12.6 miles long.

Past winners

Notes

External links

Recent results

Annual sporting events in the United States
Half marathons in the United States
Half marathon
Recurring sporting events established in 1997
1997 establishments in Illinois